Bayankhongor Airport  is a public airport located in Bayankhongor, the capital of Bayankhongor Province in Mongolia.

Airlines and destinations

See also 

 List of airports in Mongolia
 List of airlines of Mongolia

References

External links

World aero data Bayankhongor
World airport codes Bayankhongor

Airports in Mongolia